The FBA Type H was a French reconnaissance flying boat produced in large numbers in France and Italy during World War I by Franco-British Aviation.

Design and development

A development of the FBA Type A, the Type H shared the same basic pusher biplane configuration, but was a larger and heavier machine based on a Donnet-Lévêque design and powered by a water-cooled engine in place of the earlier type's rotary. Some Italian built Type Hs also used the higher-power Hispano motor but more had  Isotta Fraschini V.4B or  engines of the same make, both six-cylinder inlines.

The aircraft was a two bay biplane with the smaller span lower wing positioned just above the central fuselage on four supporting struts. There was no stagger and simple parallel interplane struts separated the bays; an extra, outward leaning pair supported the overhanging upper plane on each side. Ailerons were mounted only on this upper wing.  The single pusher engine was mounted on struts just below the upper wing, its two blade propeller turning in a cut-out in the wing trailing edges.

The hull of the Type H was, like that of its predecessors, a single step design. A pair of flat bottomed floats, mounted below the outer interplane struts, stabilized the aircraft on the water. Two flight crew members were accommodated side-by-side and a front gunner sat separately in the nose. The rounded, finless rudder mounted above the high tailplane distinguished the Type H from earlier FBA flying boats, which had angular vertical tails.

Production
Aside from its production in France, the type was also built extensively under licence in Italy by several firms, most importantly by  SIAI.

Variants
Type DOne Type H was built as a fighter aircraft to class D specifications, equipped with a  Hotchkiss gun and powered by a  Hispano-Suiza 8A or  Hispano-Suiza 8Aa. Although this was a landplane, its fuselage retained its basic flying boat form. Avion Cannon was its common name, though was also called the FBA 1 Ca2, or Type D cannon fighter.
Type SThe Aviation Maritime issued a Type S specification for a light patrol bomber to be powered by a  Hispano-Suiza 8Bb or  Hispano-Suiza 8Bbd. Schreck modified a Type H with larger folding wings and longer hull. Entering service in 1917 the Type S flying boats remained in service until 1923, until replaced by Latham and Blanchard flying boats.

Operational history

The Type H was the major production version of the FBA series and was operated by several air arms during the latter part of the First World War.  The great majority served with French and Italian forces. The Escadrille des Hydroavions of the Belgian Air Force was also equipped with the type and one survives on display in the Royal Museum of the Armed Forces and of Military History in central Brussels.  Four ex-Italian, Isotta Fraschini powered Type Hs were used by the British Royal Navy as training machines.

From 1926 to at least 1929 twelve FBA Hs were used in Canada by the Compagnie Aerienne Franco Canadienne to make an aerial photographic survey of both cities and countryside.

Operators

Belgian Air Force - Five aircraft

Estonian Air Force - One aircraft

French Navy

 Corpo Aeronautico Militare 962 aircraft

Peruvian Air Force - Three aircraft

Serbian Air Force and Air Defence - Three aircraft

Spanish Air Force

Royal Naval Air Service - Four aircraft

United States Navy

Uruguayan Air Force - One aircraft
 
Yugoslav Royal Navy

Specifications (Hispano 8A)

See also

References

Bibliography
 Gerdessen, Frederik. "Estonian Air Power 1918 – 1945". Air Enthusiast, No. 18, April – July 1982. pp. 61–76. .

External links

 Уголок неба
 aviafrance.com

1910s French patrol aircraft
Flying boats
FBA aircraft
Single-engined pusher aircraft
Biplanes
Aircraft first flown in 1915